Thomas Nicholas may refer to:

Thomas Nicholas (MP) (c. 1575–1638), English politician
Thomas Nicholas (antiquary) (1816–1879), Welsh antiquary and educator
Thomas Ian Nicholas (born 1980), American film actor, singer, musician, producer, director, and writer
Thomas Evan Nicholas (Niclas y Glais) (1879–1971), Welsh language poet, preacher and radical

See also
Thomas St Nicholas, MP for Canterbury